Minburra is a locality in the Australian state of South Australia located about  north of the state capital of Adelaide and about  north-east of the municipal seat in Orroroo.

The locality 's boundaries were created on 16 December 1999 and includes the site of the now-ceased government town of Gallwey.  Gallwey was proclaimed on 2 December 1880 and was declared "ceased to exist" on 24 September 1944.<ref name="LMV"/

Land use within the locality is ’primary production’ and is concerned with “agricultural production and the grazing of stock on relatively large holdings.

The 2016 Australian census which was conducted in August 2016 reports that no people were living in Minburra.

It is located within the federal division of Grey, the state electoral district of Stuart and the local government area of the District Council of Orroroo Carrieton.

References

Towns in South Australia